World Leader Pretend was a five-person rock band from New Orleans, featuring Keith Ferguson (lead vocals), Parker Hutchinson (keyboards), Matt Martin (guitar), Arthur Mintz (drums), and Alex Smith (bass). The band formed in 2000, and their name came from the 5th track of the album Green by R.E.M.

Their first album, Fit For Faded was released in 2003 on Renaissance Records, a New Orleans label. In 2004, they were signed to Warner Bros. Records. An appearance at the first annual CMJ Cleveland and other North American tour dates coincided with the June 28, 2005 release of their major label debut, Punches.

The band broke up in early 2008, shortly after traveling to Seattle, Washington, to record their 2nd major release, due to "artistic differences" within the band.

Discography

Albums
Fit For Faded (2003)
Panic Button – 4:09
The Driving Rain – 5:04
Your Tax Dollars at Work – 4:08
A Small Thought – 3:39
Fit For Faded – 5:39
Fire With Fire – 5:39
Flow – 3:49
Headlights – 1:31
Shape-Shifter – 2:32
Fish – 4:16
Theme – 7:24
Rubble-Rousing Misspent Bouts EP (2005)
Bang Theory – 4:41
Punches – 3:51
Tit for Tat – 3:52
Into Thin Air – 5:09
Punches (2005)

External links
Myspace

Pitchfork review of Punches

Alternative rock groups from Louisiana
Musical groups from New Orleans
Musical groups disestablished in 2008
Warner Records artists